Menongue, formerly Serpa Pinto, is a town, a municipality, and the capital of Cuando Cubango Province in Angola. The municipality had a population of 320,914 in 2014. It is one of the four municipalities in Angola whose inhabitants are predominantly Mbunda.

Menongue is the current terminus of the Moçâmedes Railway, from Moçâmedes, and also home of the small Menongue Airport.

History
During the colonial period, the town was called Serpa Pinto, in honour of the namesake Portuguese explorer.

Sports
FC Cuando Cubango, promoted to the 2018 Girabola, the top flight of Angolan soccer, play in Menongue.

See also
Mbunda language
Mbunda people
Mbunda Kingdom

References

Populated places in Cuando Cubango Province
Municipalities of Angola
Provincial capitals in Angola